More than one Ralph held the title and rank of earl. They include:

 Ralph the Timid, Earl of Hereford (d. 1057)
 Ralph de Gael,  Earl of East Anglia (d. c. 1096)
 Ralph Stafford, 1st Earl of Stafford (d. 1372)
 Ralph de Neville, 1st Earl of Westmorland (d. 1425)
 Ralph Neville, 2nd Earl of Westmorland (d. 1484)
 Ralph Neville, 3rd Earl of Westmorland (d. 1499)
 Ralph Neville, 4th Earl of Westmorland (d. 1549)
 Ralph Gore, 1st Earl of Ross (d. 1802)
 Ralph Howard, 7th Earl of Wicklow (d. 1946)

See also
 Ralph Verney, 1st Earl Verney
 Ralph Verney, 2nd Earl Verney